Air Kuning Selatan is a small town in Tampin District, Negeri Sembilan in Malaysia.

List of townships
 Taman Sungai Dua
 Kampung Sungai Dua
 Felda Bukit Jalor
 Kampung Baru
 Taman Sri
 Taman Kompleks Sukan 
 Taman Semarak
 Taman Semarak 2
 Taman Air Kuning Selatan
 Kampung Parit Buloh
 Kampung Tengah
 Kampung Paya Lebar
 Kampung Ulu
 Kampung Punggor
 Kampung Mantai(Malacca)
 Kampung Baru Batang Melaka
 Kampung Onn Lock

Education

Primary schools
 SJK(C) Air Kuning
 SK Air Kuning
 SJK(T) Air Kuning
 SJK(C) Bukit Kledek
 SJK(T) Bukit Kledek
 SK Bukit Jalor
 SK(A)Mahad Ahmadi

Secondary schools
 SMK (Felda) Bukit Jalor Zon Air Kuning Selatan
 Maktab Rendah Sains Mara (MRSM) Sg. Dua 
 Mahad Ahmaddi 
 SMK Dato'Taha

References

Tampin District
Towns in Negeri Sembilan